Stephen Alan "Steve" McAlpine (born May 23, 1949) is an American lawyer and politician. McAlpine served as the fifth lieutenant governor of Alaska from 1982 until 1990.

Early life
Stephen Alan McAlpine was born in Yakima, Washington on May 23, 1949, the fourth child of Robert E. and Myrtle B. (née Loomis) McAlpine. He attended school in Yakima, as well as two years at Maryknoll Seminary in Mountain View, California. He attended the University of Washington, graduating with a degree in history and political science. He later graduated from the University of Puget Sound School of Law in 1976 with a J.D. degree.

McAlpine originally came to Alaska in 1970 accompanied by a friend from college, Mano Frey.  The two visited Alaska while taking a break from studies and decided to stay, settling in Valdez.  They worked construction during the building of the trans-Alaska pipeline.  McAlpine continued law school until he graduated, while Frey would go on to become a major labor union figure in Alaska, serving as head of Alaska's AFL-CIO from 1984 to 2002.

Law career
In 1977, McAlpine partnered with James D. Ginotti in the Law Firm of Ginotti & McAlpine, PC.

Following the end of his tenure in elected office (see below), McAlpine moved to Anchorage, Alaska and resumed the practice of law, which he continues to the present day.

Political career

Local politics
During the late 1970s, McAlpine was elected to the Valdez city council and went on to serve two terms as mayor of Valdez.

Lieutenant governor
In 1982, he was elected as lieutenant governor of Alaska, serving with Governor Bill Sheffield, an Anchorage hotelier.  Sheffield, plagued by various scandals in his administration during his term as governor, lost renomination in the 1986 primary election to Steve Cowper, a Fairbanks lawyer and former state representative.  McAlpine won renomination as lieutenant governor, however, and in the general election, was reelected alongside Cowper.

As his tenure as lieutenant governor occurred during the Exxon Valdez oil spill, McAlpine found himself the subject of national media attention, particularly given his ties to Valdez.

McAlpine later ran for governor, but lost in the primary election to Tony Knowles.

Legacy
McAlpine holds a number of distinctions resulting from his tenure as lieutenant governor.  When elected in 1982, McAlpine was the first baby boomer elected to statewide office in Alaska. His election at age 33 made him the youngest person elected to statewide office in Alaska, which still stands today.  He is also the only two-term lieutenant governor in the state's history to have served under different governors.

References

 

1949 births
Alaska city council members
Alaska Democrats
Alaska lawyers
Lieutenant Governors of Alaska
Living people
Maryknoll Seminary alumni
Mayors of Valdez, Alaska
Politicians from Anchorage, Alaska
Politicians from Yakima, Washington
Seattle University School of Law alumni
University of Washington College of Arts and Sciences alumni
Lawyers from Anchorage, Alaska